Bapat is an Indian family name (The Chitpavan Brahmin. 

Gotra: Vashishtha. Kulswamy: Shree Vyadeshwar (Guhagar, Maharashtra). Kulswamini: Yogeshwari (Ambejogai, Maharashtra).

Origin: Chiplun, Dhaulvalli, Ganapati Pule and Ratnagiri.

Girish Bapat (born 1963), Indian politician
Priya Bapat (born 1986), Indian actress
Ravindra Bapat (born 1954), Indian statistician
Senapati Bapat (1880–1967), Indian revolutionary
Ulhas Bapat (born 1950), Indian musician
Vasant Bapat (1922–2002), Indian poet
Vishnu Vaman Bapat (1871–1927), Indian philosopher

Indian surnames